Earthquake Hazards Reduction Act of 1977 is a statute formulating a national policy to diminish the perils of earthquakes in the United States. The Act of Congress is a declaration for an earthquake prediction system, national earthquake hazards reduction program, and seismological research studies. The United States public law authorizes States assistance through the provisions of the Disaster Relief Act of 1974.

The Senate legislation was passed by the 95th U.S. Congressional session and enacted into law by the President Jimmy Carter on October 7, 1977.

Sections of the Act
The Act was drafted as six sections defining the codified law within Title 42 Public Health and Social Welfare.

Amendments to 1977 Act
U.S. Congressional amendments to the Earthquake Hazards Reduction Act.

See also

 Advisory Committee on Earthquake Hazards Reduction
 National Earthquake Hazards Reduction Program
 Earthquake engineering
 Earthquake forecasting
 Earthquake prediction
 Earthquake warning system
 Fault Zone
 National Earthquake Prediction Evaluation Council
 Office of Science and Technology Policy
 Seismo-electromagnetics
 Seismological Society of America
 Seismology

External links
 
 
 
 
 
 
 
 

1977 in American law
95th United States Congress
1977 in the United States